HMS B4 was one of 11 B-class submarines built for the Royal Navy in the first decade of the 20th century. The boat survived the First World War and was sold for scrap in 1919.

Design and description
The B class was an enlarged and improved version of the preceding A class. They displaced  on the surface and  submerged. The B-class submarines had a crew of two officers and thirteen ratings.

For surface running, the boats were powered by a single 16-cylinder  Vickers petrol engine that drove one propeller shaft. When submerged the propeller was driven by a  electric motor. They could reach  on the surface and  underwater.

The boats were armed with two 18-inch (450 mm) torpedo tubes in the bow. They could carry a pair of reload torpedoes, but generally did not as they would have to remove an equal weight of fuel in compensation.

Construction and career
B4 was built by Vickers at their Barrow-in-Furness shipyard, launched on 14 November 1905 and completed on 28 January 1906.

B4 collided with a dredger when entering Portsmouth harbour on 21 July 1906 and was badly damaged as a result, having to be beached before being taken into dry dock for repair. When the war began in 1914, the boat was assigned to defend the Straits of Dover. B4 was sold for breaking up on 1 April 1919 to the Ardrossan Dry Dock Co.

Notes

References
 
 
 
 
 

 

British B-class submarines
World War I submarines of the United Kingdom
Ships built in Barrow-in-Furness
Royal Navy ship names
1905 ships